Peshoton Dubash (born 20 May 1891, date of death unknown) was a British writer. His work was part of the literature event in the art competition at the 1924 Summer Olympics.

References

1891 births
Year of death missing
19th-century British male writers
20th-century British male writers
Olympic competitors in art competitions
Writers from Mumbai